Mirko Bortolotti (born 10 January 1990) is an Italian racing driver from Trento. He has won the Italian Formula 3 Championship in 2008, the FIA Formula 2 Championship in 2011, the Eurocup Megane Trophy in 2013 and the Blancpain GT Series Endurance and Overall Championship in 2017. He competed as a factory driver for Lamborghini between 2016 and 2019, before moving to Audi for 2020 and rejoining Lamborghini in 2021. He competed in the 2022 Deutsche Tourenwagen Masters with GRT Grasser Racing Team, a factory-backed Lamborghini team based in Austria.

Career

Italian series
After karting for several years, Bortolotti began his formula racing career in 2005 by competing in the Italian Formula Renault Winter Series and Formula Gloria. He competed in the Winter Series for a further two years, with a best finish of fourth in 2006. He also drove in the Italian Formula Junior 1600 championship for this year, in addition to the Formula Azzurra championship. In the latter series he finished as runner-up in the drivers' championship, behind winner Giuseppe Termine.

In 2007, Bortolotti moved up to Italian Formula Three, finishing fourth in the championship at his first attempt. He remained in the series for 2008, driving for the Lucidi Motors team, and won the championship with nine wins and six pole positions from the sixteen races.

FIA Formula Two Championship
Bortolotti obtained backing from Red Bull following his championship win; the company opted to place him in the relaunched FIA Formula Two Championship in 2009. He drove car number 14 in the series, and finished fourth. During the break between the final two rounds of the season, Bortolotti returned to Formula Three to compete for Carlin Motorsport in the Formula 3 Euro Series season finale at Hockenheim, finishing on the podium in the second race.

GP3 Series
Bortolotti's next move was to the newly created GP3 Series. He drove in the 2010 season for Addax Team alongside teammates Felipe Guimarães and Pablo Sánchez López and managed some good results, finishing 11th and getting a podium in his final race.

Return to FIA Formula Two Championship
Bortolotti decided to return to FIA Formula Two Championship for 2011. His season began well as he took the lead in the championship after the first round. He lost it to Christopher Zanella, later regaining the lead at the third round. He dominated the fourth round of the season at the Nürburgring, taking pole position, victory and the fastest lap in both races. He led the rest of the season, and eventually won the championship by 100 points over Zanella.

Formula One
As a reward for their performances in the 2008 Italian F3 championship, Bortolotti, Edoardo Piscopo and Salvatore Cicatelli were all given a test of the Ferrari team's F2008 chassis at the Fiorano Circuit in November 2008. Bortolotti impressed by setting a time of 59.111 seconds, quicker than the previous fastest lap set by the F2008 at the circuit by any driver.

In , among several other drivers, Bortolotti was linked to a drive with Ferrari as a replacement for injured Felipe Massa, after poor performances by Luca Badoer.

In , Bortolotti was selected by Williams to appear in their car at the 2011 young drivers test in Abu Dhabi.

GT Racing 
The Italian has competed in various GT formats such as the Blancpain GT Series (Sprint and Endurance), ADAC GT Masters, Italian GT, IMSA Wheatertech Sportscar Championship (Rolex 24h at Daytona, Mobile 1 12h of Sebring), 24h of Dubai, Total 24h of Spa as well as the FIA GT World Cup Macau.

In 2017 Bortolotti has won the Endurance Cup of the Blancpain GT Series with GRT Grasser Racing Team and won the overall driver championship with his team mate Christian Engelhart.

From 2020, Bortolotti moved representative from Lamborghini to Audi. Now, he is racing R8 LMS GT3 EVO in the GT World Challenge Europe Series (former is Blancpain GT Series) Endurance Cup and ADAC GT Masters with WRT (Belgian Club W Racing Team ). In GT World Challenge Europe Series, he shares the car with Kelvin Vander Linde and Rolf Ineichen in Car #31. Car#30 with Rolf Ineichen in ADAC GT Masters respectively.

2023 saw Bortolotti join Andrea Caldarelli and Jordan Pepper in Iron Lynx's Pro class effort in the GT World Challenge Europe Endurance Cup.

Deutsche Tourenwagen Masters 

In September 2021, Bortolotti made his debut in the Deutsche Tourenwagen Masters as a guest driver for T3 Motorsport as the German team fielded a third Lamborghini Huracán GT3 Evo car in the sixth round of the 2021 DTM season at Assen. There, he finished second in the first race on Saturday and seventh in the second race on Sunday. In February 2022, Bortolotti earned a full-time seat for the 2022 DTM season with GRT Grasser Racing Team as the Austrian team joined the series by fielding four Lamborghini Huracán GT3 Evo cars with factory-backing from the Italian manufacturer.

In the first round of the 2022 DTM season at Portimão, Bortolotti finished third in both races. He qualified on pole position for the first race of the weekend and led 19 laps, but his car suffered a sudden loss of power after a safety-car period and he fell to sixth position with 10 laps to go, before recovering to fourth and eventually overtaking the Mercedes of Maro Engel on the final lap for third, with Mercedes drivers Lucas Auer and Luca Stolz finishing in front of him. In the first race of the third round at Imola, Bortolotti scored his third podium finish of the season, recovering to third after starting from 16th due to a 10-place grid penalty for using a wrong set of tyres. After experiencing his first retirement of the season in the first race of the fourth round at the Norisring, he finished second in the second race of the weekend and moved to the top of the drivers' standings with half the season completed.

Racing record

Career summary

† As Bortolotti was a guest driver, he was ineligible to score points
* Season still in progress.

Complete FIA Formula Two Championship results
(key) (Races in bold indicate pole position) (Races in italics indicate fastest lap)

Complete Formula 3 Euro Series results
(key) (Races in bold indicate pole position) (Races in italics indicate fastest lap)

† As Bortolotti was a guest driver, he was ineligible for championship points.

Complete GP3 Series results
(key) (Races in bold indicate pole position) (Races in italics indicate fastest lap)

† Bortolotti did not finish the race, but was classified as he completed over 90% of the race distance.

Complete Eurocup Mégane Trophy results
(key) (Races in bold indicate pole position) (Races in italics indicate fastest lap)

Complete Formula Acceleration 1 results
(key) (Races in bold indicate pole position) (Races in italics indicate fastest lap)

Complete GT World Challenge Europe Sprint Cup results

Complete IMSA SportsCar Championship results
(key) (Races in bold indicate pole position; races in italics indicate fastest lap)

* Season still in progress.

24 Hours of Daytona results

Complete Bathurst 12 Hour results

Complete Deutsche Tourenwagen Masters results
(key) (Races in bold indicate pole position; races in italics indicate fastest lap)

† As Bortolotti was a guest driver, he was ineligible to score points.

Complete FIA World Endurance Championship results 

* Season still in progress.

Complete 24 Hours of Le Mans results

References

External links
 
 

1990 births
Living people
Sportspeople from Trento
Italian racing drivers
Italian Formula Renault 2.0 drivers
Italian Formula Three Championship drivers
FIA Formula Two Championship drivers
Formula 3 Euro Series drivers
Italian GP3 Series drivers
ADAC GT Masters drivers
Eurocup Mégane Trophy drivers
Blancpain Endurance Series drivers
24 Hours of Spa drivers
24 Hours of Daytona drivers
WeatherTech SportsCar Championship drivers
24H Series drivers
Carlin racing drivers
24 Hours of Le Mans drivers
RP Motorsport drivers
Audi Sport drivers
Emil Frey Racing drivers
W Racing Team drivers
Italian Formula Renault 1.6 drivers
Nürburgring 24 Hours drivers
FIA Motorsport Games drivers
Lamborghini Squadra Corse drivers
Iron Lynx drivers
Lamborghini Super Trofeo drivers
FIA World Endurance Championship drivers
Prema Powerteam drivers